Reg Burgess (born 6 August 1934) is a former Australian rules footballer who played 124 Victorian Football League (VFL) games for the Essendon Bombers.

Burgess was a centreman and debuted for Essendon in 1954. He was one of Essendon's best players in the 1950s and won the club's best and fairest in 1957 and 1960. He represented Victoria in 1957-58 and 1960. Burgess left Essendon in 1960 at the age of 26 to captain-coach Casterton.

Champions of Essendon 
In 2002 an Essendon panel ranked him at 13 in their Champions of Essendon list of the 25 greatest players ever to have played for Essendon.

External links

1934 births
Living people
Australian rules footballers from Victoria (Australia)
Essendon Football Club players
Champions of Essendon
Crichton Medal winners
All-Australians (1953–1988)
Casterton Football Club players